SD Entertainment is an American animation studio specialising in direct-to-DVD and theatrical movies for children. The "SD" in the initials of the company name stand for Sabella Dern, the respective last names of its founders: former MGM Animation employees Paul Sabella and Jonathan Dern.

The company is based in Woodland Hills, California. It owned two subsidiaries, Kidtoon Films and The Bigger Picture, that deal with the distribution of SD's productions in digital venues across the United States. They were eventually acquired by Cinedigm.

List of works by SD 
 Bratz Babyz: The Movie (2006)
 Major Powers & The Star Squad (2003)
 Welcome to Tonka Town (2003)

TV series
 Make Way for Noddy (2002 - 2003)
 Say it with Noddy (2005 - 2009)
 Angelina Ballerina: The Next Steps (2009 - 2010)
 Transformers: Armada (English Dub) (2002 - 2003)
 Care Bears: Adventures in Care-a-lot (2007 - 2008)
 Bob the Builder: Ready, Steady, Build! (2010 - 2011)
 My Little Pony (2003 - 2009)
 Alien Racers (2005 - 2006)

Films

External links 
 Official site

References 

Cinedigm
American animation studios
Mass media companies established in 1999
Companies based in Los Angeles County, California
1999 establishments in California